Sadat Mahmudi Rural District is a rural district (dehestan) in Pataveh District, Dana County, Kohgiluyeh and Boyer-Ahmad Province, Iran. At the 2006 census, its population was 10,370, in 2,088 families. The rural district has 42 villages.

References 

Rural Districts of Kohgiluyeh and Boyer-Ahmad Province
Dana County